The International Medical Travel Journal was established in 2007 with a focus on medical tourism. It runs a biweekly newsletter.

Keith Pollard is the Editor in Chief and features as a speaker at medical tourism conferences.  He is also executive chairman of the health care research firm LaingBuisson International, and is featured at the Medical Travel Summits organised by LaingBuisson International.  The conference in Athens in May 2018 was organised in conjunction with Elitour, the Greek Medical Tourism Council.

It runs annual Medical Travel Awards. Mahathir Mohamad, Prime Minister of Malaysia cited them in 2018 among the "global accolades" National Heart Institute had received.  Subsequently Malaysia was awarded "Destination of the Year" by the journal in 2020.

References

Medical tourism
Medical magazines
Professional and trade magazines